Pieter Celie (born 1942 in Eindhoven) is a Dutch artist

Biography
Pieter Celie (born Theodor Geert van de Built) was born in Eindhoven in 1942, son of the photographer Bernardt van de Built. Celie trained his artistic skills in the Eindhoven’s Academy for Industrial Design (1967–1969) and later in the Antwerp’s National Institute for the Arts. Since the beginning he mixed several media in a personal style, working both as a sculptor, draftsman, painter, designer and photographer. His work is highly influenced by Pop art and exhales the artist’s sense of humour, constituting a playful corpus of life-size wooden figures, colourful paintings with inserted strings, and evocative collages of photographs and drawings.

He founded the artistic group Unknown Genius (Miskende geniën)in his youth. His persona is polemical since already in 1969 he went on a trial for the scandal that his piece "Twenty penis" created; in 1976 the artist remained by mistake 22 days in jail and the sequel appeared in 1999 when he executed the piece "Groeten uit Sint-Gillis" (1999) evocating his stay in jail.

The artist has been actively exhibiting his work between Belgium and the Netherlands, in prestigious art centers like the Fine Arts Palace in Brussels, the Museum of Fine Arts in Antwerp, the Boymans van Beuningen Museum in Rotterdam and the Krabbedans and the Museum Kempenland in Eindhoven. His creations integrate the collections of important instances like the Dutch State, the Belgian State and the Museum of West-Flanders. He does currently live in Antwerp, Belgium.

See also

History of painting
Western painting

References

External links
 Pieter Celie at Play BKR Eindhoven

1942 births
Living people
Dutch artists
Design Academy Eindhoven alumni
People from Eindhoven